Wendy Sandler (born 1949, Cleveland, Ohio) is an American-Israeli linguist who is known for her research on the phonology of Sign Languages.

Career and research 
Sandler earned her PhD in linguistics from the University of Texas at Austin in 1987, with a dissertation entitled "Sequentiality and simultaneity in American Sign Language." A revised version of her dissertation was published in 1989 under the title, "Phonological Representation of the Sign: Linearity and Nonlinearity in Sign Language Phonology."

After her dissertation, Sandler took up a position at the University of Haifa, Israel, where she became a Professor of Linguistics in the Department of English Language and Literature. She was also the Founding Director of the Sign Language Research Lab there.

Sandler has co-written a book on Israeli Sign Language with Irit Meir (Meir & Sandler 2007). With Diane Lillo-Martin, she has co-authored a standard linguistic introduction to the phonology and syntax of American Sign Language (Sandler & Lillo-Martin 2006).

In collaboration with Mark Aronoff, Irit Meir and Carol Padden, Sandler has made fundamental contributions to the investigation of the emergence of language with her research on Al-Sayyid Bedouin Sign Language. This research is featured in Talking Hands, by Margalit Fox.

Honors and awards 
In December 2017, Sandler won a prize of 150,000 Israeli new shekels from Mifal HaPayis for her conceptual research systems while following new sign languages which are being converted into functional communication, including a sign language of a Bedouin community in Israel.

During 2014–2018, Sandler led a European Research Council (ERC) Advanced Grant entitled, "The Grammar of the Body: Revealing the Foundations of Compositionality in Human Language" (GRAMBY).

In 2020, Sandler was elected to the American Academy of Arts and Sciences.

Key publications 
Sandler, Wendy. 1989. Phonological Representation of the Sign: Linearity and Nonlinearity in Sign Language Phonology. Dordrecht: Foris.
Sandler, Wendy and Diane Lillo-Martin. 2006. Sign Language and Linguistic Universals. Cambridge University Press.
Meir, Irit & Wendy Sandler. 2007. A Language in Space: the Story of Israeli Sign Language. Psychology Press.
Sandler, Wendy, Aronoff, Mark, Padden, Carol & Meir, Irit. (2014). Language emergence. In J. Sindell, P. Kockelman & N. Enfield (Eds.), The Cambridge handbook of linguistic anthropology (pp. 250–284). Cambridge: Cambridge University Press.
Sandler, Wendy, Meir, Irit, Padden, Carol & Aronoff, Mark. 2005. The emergence of grammar: Systematic structure in a new language. PNAS 102, 2661-2665. 
Sandler, Wendy. (2012). Dedicated gestures in the emergence of sign language. Gesture 12/3, 265-307.
Sandler, Wendy, Aronoff, Mark, Meir, Irit, Padden, Carol. (2011). The Gradual Emergence of Phonological Form in a New Language.  Natural Language and Linguistic Theory 29, 503-543.
Sandler, Wendy. (2010). The phonology of movement in sign language. In Blackwell companion to phonology, Marc van Oostendorp, Colin Ewen, Keren Rice, and Elizabeth Hume (Eds.), Oxford: Wiley-Blackwell. 577–603.

References

External links 

http://www.talkinghandsbook.com/
http://gramby.haifa.ac.il/
http://signlab.haifa.ac.il/

Year of birth missing (living people)
Living people
Linguists from Israel
Women linguists
Linguists of sign languages
University of Texas at Austin College of Liberal Arts alumni
Academic staff of the University of Haifa
1949 births